Kerens may refer to:

 Kerens, Texas, a city in Navarro County, Texas, United States
 Kerens, West Virginia
 Richard C. Kerens (1842-1916), an American politician and diplomat

See also
 Keren (disambiguation)